Malavath Poorna (born 10 June 2000) is an Indian mountaineer. On 25 May 2014, Poorna climbed Mount Everest, aged 13 years and 11 months, the youngest Indian and the youngest female to have reached the summit. Purna climbed Mount Elbrus, the highest peak in Russia and Europe on 27 July 2017. After reaching the summit of Elbrus, Poorna unfurled a 50 ft long Indian Tricolor and sang the Indian National Anthem. She completed the Seven Summits on 5 June 2022 climbing Mount Denali, along with father-daughter duo Ajeet Bajaj and Deeya Bajaj.  

A film based on Poorna's life story was released in 2017 named Poorna: Courage Has No Limit directed by Rahul Bose.

Early life and background
Poorna was born at Pakala village, Nizamabad district of Telangana state of India. She joined Telangana Social Welfare Residential Educational Institutions Society for her education. Her talent was spotted by the secretary of the Society Dr. Repalle Shiva Praveen Kumar IPS. She was shortlisted for Operation Everest. In preparation for climbing Mount Everest she trekked to mountains of Ladakh and Darjeeling.

Seven Summits 

 Everest (Asia, 2014)
 Kilimanjaro (Africa, 2016)
 Elbrus (Europe, 2017)
 Aconcagua (South America, 2019)
 Carstensz Pyramid (Oceania region, 2019)
 Vinson Massif (Antarctica, 2019)
 Denali (North America, 2022)

Forbes List 
Poorna was listed on the Forbes India list of the self-made women in 2020.

Biography
Poorna's biography has been written in the form of book format by Aparna Thota. The book captures Poorna's journey from her home town Pakala, a village in Nizamabad district of Telangana, to Everest even though she came from such a small village she managed to accomplish her dreams.

See also
Indian summiters of Mount Everest - Year wise
List of Mount Everest summiters by number of times to the summit
List of Mount Everest records of India
List of Mount Everest records

Notes

References

External links
 

Living people
Telugu people
Indian female mountain climbers
Indian mountain climbers
2000 births
People from Nizamabad district
Indian summiters of Mount Everest
Sportswomen from Telangana
21st-century Indian women
21st-century Indian people
Adivasi
Scheduled Tribes of India
Mountain climbers from Telangana